Araxoceras is an extinct genus of ceratitid ammonites that lived in the Late Permian marine environments of Iran, South China and Japan.  The various species had distinctive, angular-cornered shells.

References 

Otoceratina
Permian ammonites
Ceratitida genera
Permian animals of Asia
Fossil taxa described in 1959